Bobby Pate is a former American football player and coach. He played college football at South Georgia State College under then-head coach Bobby Bowden before finishing his career at Presbyterian College in Clinton, South Carolina. He was selected by the San Francisco 49ers in the 1960 NFL Draft, as well as by the Boston Patriots in the 1960 American Football League draft.

Pate began his coaching career at several Georgia high schools. He entered the college football ranks as an assistant coach at Western Carolina University from 1974 to 1979.

His first collegiate head coaching job came at the University of West Georgia, where he served from 1981 to 1984. He led West Georgia to the 1982 NCAA Division III National Championship.

Head coaching record

College

References

Year of birth missing (living people)
Living people
American football halfbacks
Presbyterian Blue Hose football players
Western Carolina Catamounts football coaches
West Georgia Wolves football coaches
High school football coaches in Georgia (U.S. state)